Toxicoscordion venenosum, with the common names death camas and meadow death camas, is a species of flowering plants in the genus Toxicoscordion, of the Melanthiaceae family. It is native to western North America from New Mexico to Saskatchewan and west to the Pacific Ocean.

The plant is called alapíšaš in Sahaptin, and nupqasaquⱡ ("nup-ka-sa-qush") in Ktunaxa.

Description
Toxicoscordion venenosum grows up to 70 cm tall with long, basal, grass-like leaves. The bulbs are oval and look like onions but do not smell like edible onions of the genus Allium.

The flowers are cream coloured or white and grow in pointed clusters, flowering between April and July. The flower clusters are a raceme (each cluster branches once along the main stalk), unlike its close relative Toxicoscordion paniculatum, in which the flowers are born in a panicle (doubly branched flower stalks). The flowers have three sepals and three petals.

Varieties
Varieties include:
 Toxicoscordion venenosum var. gramineum (Rydb.) Brasher
 Toxicoscordion venenosum var. venenosuma variety or the solo current species classification

Distribution
The plant is widespread across much of Western Canada, the Western United States, and northern Baja California (México).   They tend to grow in dry meadows and on dry hillsides as well as sagebrush slopes and montane forests.

Toxicity
All parts of the plant are poisonous. It is dangerous for humans as well as livestock. Consumption of 2% to 6% of the body weight of the animal is likely to be fatal. Along with other alkaloids, zygacine and other toxic esters of zygadenine are the primary neurotoxic alkaloids contributing to the plant's toxicity.

The plant is visited by a specialist mining bee, Andrena astragali, which is possibly the only bee that can tolerate its toxins. Others are fatally poisoned.

References

External links
Calflora Database: Toxicoscordion venenosum (Meadow deathcamas)
Jepson Manual eFlora (TJM2) treatment of Toxicoscordion venenosum var. venenosum
USDA Plants Profile for Zigadenus venenosus var. venenosus (meadow deathcamas)
Lady Bird Johnson Wild Flower Center: Zigadenus venenosus (Meadow death camas, death camas)
Turner Photographics, Wildflowers of the Pacific Northwest: Zigadenus venenosus (Meadow death camas)
 UC Photos gallery — Toxicoscordion venenosum

venenosum
Flora of the Western United States
Flora of the Northwestern United States
Flora of Alberta
Flora of Baja California
Flora of California
Flora of British Columbia
Flora of Nebraska
Flora of Nevada
Flora of New Mexico
Flora of North Dakota
Flora of Saskatchewan
Flora of South Dakota
Flora of Utah
Flora of the Sierra Nevada (United States)
Natural history of the California chaparral and woodlands
Plants described in 1879
Flora without expected TNC conservation status